"Coma" is a song by Australian singer-songwriter Max Sharam. In 1992, she performed the song on New Faces, which led to an extended play album being released in October 1994 and as the lead single from her debut studio album A Million Year Girl (1995). The song peaked at number 14 in Australia.

At the ARIA Music Awards of 1995, the song was nominated for three awards; ARIA Award for Single for the Year, Song for the Year and Breakthrough Artist - single.

Reception
Anthony Horan said "A five track EP, it's a remarkable piece of work that sounds quite unlike anything else you'll hear this year. While the title track, courtesy of a very radio-friendly mix, has just been added to the playlists of chart-fodder radio stations after a large amount of play on Triple J, there's a lot more to Max than meets the eye. The EP's brief journey takes in everything from twisted jazz-pop to searing acoustic emotion to very, very strange and rather wonderful operatic experimentation."

Track listings
Extended play (4509976752)
 "Coma (A Million Year Girl)" – 3:46
 "Hunting Ground" – 4:33
 "U Cradle Me" – 3:46
 "Is It Ok...?" – 2:59
 "Crash Landing" – 4:24

CD single (4509993912)
 "Coma (A Million Year Girl)" – 3:46
 "U Cradle Me" – 3:46
 "Crash Landing" – 4:24

Charts

References

1992 songs
1994 debut singles
1994 EPs
East West Records EPs
East West Records singles
EPs by Australian artists